Anđelković is a Serbian surname, a patronymic derived from Anđelko. It may refer to:

Dušan Anđelković
Marko Anđelković
Miodrag Anđelković
Siniša Anđelković
Koča Anđelković
Sava Anđelkovic
Nebojša Anđelković - Nele

See also
Anđelović

Serbian surnames